Nivelle is a commune in the Nord department in northern France.

Heraldry

See also
Communes of the Nord department
 Nivelle Offensive

References

Communes of Nord (French department)
Nord communes articles needing translation from French Wikipedia